A constitutional referendum was held in Haiti on 29 March 1987. A new constitution had been drafted by a Constitutional Assembly elected the year before, and was reportedly approved by 99.8% of voters.

Results

References

1987 in Haiti
Haiti
Initiatives and referendums in Haiti
Constitutional referendums in Haiti
March 1987 events in North America